Salim Saghul (also Romanized as Salīm Sāghūl; also known as Salīm Sāghlū and Salīmsāghlū) is a village in Mokriyan-e Gharbi Rural District, in the Central District of Mahabad County, West Azerbaijan Province, Iran. At the 2006 census, its population was 225, in 37 families.

References 

Populated places in Mahabad County